Alexandrini is a village of the Agia municipality. Before the 2011 local government reform it was a part of the municipality of Evrymenes. The 2011 census recorded 161 inhabitants in the village and 244 in the community. Alexandrini is a part of the community of Palaiopyrgos.

Geography
Alexandrini is a coastal village located near the delta of Pineios river.

Population
According to the 2011 census, the population of the settlement of Alexandrini was 83 people, a decrease of almost 42% compared with the population of the previous census of 2001.

See also
 List of settlements in the Larissa regional unit

References

Populated places in Larissa (regional unit)